Lingala (Ngala) (Lingala: Lingála) is a Bantu language spoken in the northwest of the Democratic Republic of the Congo, the northern half of the Republic of the Congo, in their capitals, Kinshasa and Brazzaville, and to a lesser degree in Angola, the Central African Republic and southern South Sudan. Lingala has 25–30 million native speakers and about 35 million second-language speakers, for a total of 60-65 million speakers.

History

Prior to 1880, Bobangi was an important trade language on the western sections of the Congo river, more precisely between Stanley Pool (Kinshasa) and the confluence of the Congo and Ubangi rivers. When in the early 1880s, the first Europeans and their West- and East-African troops started founding state posts for the Belgian king along this river section, they noticed the widespread use and prestige of Bobangi. They attempted to learn it, but only cared to acquire an imperfect knowledge of it, a process that gave rise to a new, strongly restructured variety, at first called "the trade language", "the language of the river", "Bobangi-pidgin" and others. In 1884, the Europeans and their troops introduced this restructured variety of Bobangi in the important state post Bangala Station, namely to communicate with the local Congolese, some of whom had second-language knowledge of original Bobangi, as well as with the many Congolese from more remote areas whom missionaries and colonials had been relocating to the station by force. The language of the river was therefore soon renamed "Bangala", a label the Europeans had since 1876 also been using as a convenient, but erroneous and non-original, name to lump all Congolese of that region together ethnically.

Around 1901–2, CICM missionaries started a project to "purify" the Bangala language in order to cleanse it from the "unpure", pidginlike features it had acquired when it emerged out of Bobangi in the early 1880s. Meeuwis (2020: 24-25) writes:

Around and shortly after 1901, a number of both Catholic and Protestant missionaries working in the western and northern Congo Free State, independently of one another but in strikingly parallel terms, judged that Bangala as it had developed out of Bobangi was too “pidgin like”, “too poor” a language to function as a proper means of education and evangelization. Each of them set out on a program of massive corpus planning, aimed at actively “correcting” and “enlarging” Bangala from above [...]. One of them was the Catholic missionary Egide De Boeck of the Congregatio Immaculati Cordis Mariae (CICM, commonly known as “the Missionaries of Scheut” or “Scheutists”), who arrived in Bangala Station – Nouvelle Anvers in 1901. Another one was the Protestant missionary Walter H. Stapleton [...], and a third one the Catholic Léon Derikx of the Premonstratensian Fathers [...]. By 1915, De Boeck’s endeavors had proven to be more influential than Stapleton’s, whose language creative suggestions, as the Protestant missionaries’ conference of 1911 admitted, had never been truly implemented [...]. Under the dominance of De Boeck’s work, Derikx’s discontinued his after less than 10 years.

The importance of Lingala as a vernacular has since grown with the size and importance of its main centers of use, Kinshasa and Brazzaville; with its use as the lingua franca of the armed forces; and with the popularity of soukous music.

Name 
At first the language the European pioneers and their African troops had forged out of Bobangi was referred to as "the river language" or "the trade language" and other volatile labels. From 1884 onwards it was called "Bangala", due to its introduction in Bangala Station. After 1901, Catholic missionaries of CICM, also called 'the Congregation of Scheutists', proposed to rename the language "Lingala", a proposition which took some decades to be generally accepted, both by colonials and the Congolese. The name Lingala first appears in writing in a publication by the CICM missionary Égide De Boeck (1901-2). This name change was accepted in western and northwestern Congo (as well as in other countries where the language was spoken), but not in northeastern Congo where the variety of the language spoken locally is still called Bangala.

Characteristics and usage 
Lingala is a Bantu-based creole of Central Africa with roots in the Bobangi language, the language that provided the bulk of its lexicon and grammar. In its basic vocabulary, Lingala also has many borrowings from various other languages, such as: Swahili, Kikongo varieties, French, Portuguese, and English.

In practice, the extent of borrowing varies widely with speakers of different regions (commonly among young people), and during different occasions.

French 
 momí, comes from 'ma mie' in old French meaning 'my dear" although it can sound like it means grandmother, is used in Lingala to mean girlfriend  
 kelási for class/school

Spanish
 chiclé for chewing gum

Portuguese
 manteka for butter  
 mésa for table
 sapátu for shoes

English
 míliki for milk
 súpu for soup
 mamiwata for mermaid, literally mammy/water 
 búku for book
 mótuka, from motor-car, for car

Variation 
The Lingala language can be divided into several regiolects and sociolects. The major regional varieties are northwestern Lingala, Kinshasa Lingala and Brazzaville Lingala.

Literary Lingala (lingala littéraire or lingala classique in French) is a standardized form mostly used in education and news broadcasts on state-owned radio or television, in religious services in the Roman Catholic Church and is the language taught as a subject at some educational levels. It is historically associated with the work of the Catholic Church, the Belgian CICM missionaries in particular. It has a seven-vowel system with an obligatory tense-lax vowel harmony. It also has a full range of morphological noun prefixes with mandatory grammatical agreement system with subject–verb, or noun–modifier for each of class. It is largely used in formal functions and in some forms of writing. Most native speakers of Spoken Lingala and Kinshasa Lingala consider it not to be comprehensible.

Northwestern (or Equateur) Lingala is the product of the (incomplete) internalization by Congolese of the prescriptive rules the CICM missionaries intended when designing Literary Lingala. The northwest is a zone where the CICM missionaries strongly supported the network of schools.
  
Spoken Lingala (called lingala parlé in French) is the variety mostly used in the day-to-day lives of Lingalaphones. It has a full morphological noun prefix system, but the agreement system in the noun phrase is more lax than the in the literary variety. Regarding phonology, there is a five-vowel system and there is no vowel harmony. Spoken Lingala is largely used in informal functions, and the majority of Lingala songs use spoken Lingala over other variations. Modern spoken Lingala is influenced by French; French verbs, for example, may be "lingalized" adding Lingala inflection prefixes and suffixes: "acomprenaki te" or "acomprendraki te" (he did not understand, using the French word comprendre) instead of classic Lingala "asímbaki ntína te" (literally: s/he grasped/held the root/cause not). These French influences are more prevalent in Kinshasa and are indicative of an erosion of the language as education, in French, becomes accessible to more of the population.
There are pronunciation differences between "Catholic Lingala" and "Protestant Lingala" - for example: nzala/njala (hunger).

Lingala ya Bayankee (sometimes labeled Yanké) is a widely used sociolect in Kinshasa, e.g., by street youth, street vendors, criminal gangs and homeless children. Langila is a little-studied language game (or ludic practice) initially created by musicians shortly after the millennium and increasingly used in social media and sites of cultural production.

Phonology

Vowels

Vowel harmony
Lingala words show vowel harmony to some extent. For example, the words ndɔbɔ 'fishhook' and ndobo 'mouse trap' are found, but not *ndɔbo or *ndobɔ.

Vowel shift

Consonants

(1)  is allophonic with  depending on the dialect.

Prenasalized consonants
The prenasalized stops formed with a nasal followed by a voiceless plosive are allophonic to the voiceless plosives alone in some variations of Lingala.
 :  or 
 e.g.: mpɛmbɛ́ni is pronounced  but in some variations 
 :  or 
 e.g.: ntɔ́ngó is pronounced  but in some variations 
 :  or 
 e.g.: nkanya (fork) is pronounced  but in some variations 
 e.g.: nyɔnsɔ is pronounced  but in some variations 
The prenasalized voiced occlusives,  do not vary.

Tones
Lingala being a tonal language, tone is a distinguishing feature in minimal pairs, e.g.: mutu (human being) and mutú (head), or kokoma (to write) and kokóma (to arrive). There are two tones possible, the normal one is low and the second one is high. There is a third, less common tone – starting high, dipping low and then ending high – all within the same vowel sound, e.g.: bôngó (therefore).

Tonal morphology
Tense morphemes carry tones.
 koma (komL-a : write) inflected gives
 simple present L-aL :
 nakoma naL-komL-aL (I write)
 subjunctive H-aL :
 nákoma naH-komL-aL (I would write)
 present:
 nakomí naL-komL-iH (I have been writing)
 sepela (seLpel-a : enjoy) inflected gives
 simple present L-aL :
 osepela oL-seLpelL-aL (you-SG enjoy)
 subjunctive H-aL :
 ósepéla oH-seLpelH-aH (you-SG would enjoy)
 present L-iH:
 osepelí oL-seLpelL-iH (you-SG have been enjoying)

Grammar

Noun class system
Like all Bantu languages, Lingala has a noun class system in which nouns are classified according to the prefixes they bear and according to the prefixes they trigger in sentences. The table below shows the noun classes of Lingala, ordered according to the numbering system that is widely used in descriptions of Bantu languages.

Individual classes pair up with each other to form singular/plural pairs, sometimes called 'genders'. There are seven genders in total. The singular classes 1, 3, 5, 7, and 9 take their plural forms from classes 2, 4, 6, 8, 10, respectively. Additionally, many household items found in class 9 take a class 2 prefix (ba) in the plural: lutu → balutu 'spoon', mesa → bamesa 'table', sani → basani 'plate'. Words in class 11 usually take a class 10 plural. Most words from class 14 (abstract nouns) do not have a plural counterpart.

Class 9 and 10 have a nasal prefix, which assimilates to the following consonant. Thus, the prefix shows up as 'n' on words that start with t or d, e.g. ntaba 'goat', but as 'm' on words that start with b or p (e.g. mbisi 'fish'). There is also a prefixless class 9a and 10a, exemplified by sánzá → sánzá 'moon(s) or month(s)'. Possible ambiguities are solved by the context.

Noun class prefixes do not show up only on the noun itself, but serve as markers throughout the whole sentence. In the sentences below, the class prefixes are underlined. (There is a special verbal form 'a' of the prefix for class 1 nouns.)
molakisi molai yango abiki (CL1.teacher CL1.tall that CL1:recovered) That tall teacher recovered
bato bakúmisa Nkómbó ya Yɔ́ (CL2.people CL2.praise name of You) (Let) people praise Your name (a sentence from the Lord's Prayer)

Only to a certain extent, noun class allocation is semantically governed. Classes 1/2, as in all Bantu languages, mainly contain words for human beings; similarly, classes 9/10 contain many words for animals. In other classes, semantical regularities are mostly absent or are obscured by many exceptions.

Verb inflections and morphology

Verbal extensions
There are four morphemes modifying verbs. They are added to some verb root in the following order:
 Reversive (-ol-)
 e.g.: kozinga to wrap and kozingola to develop
 Causative (-is-)
 e.g. : koyéba to know and koyébisa to inform
 Applicative (-el-)
 e.g. : kobíka to heal (self), to save (self) and kobíkela to heal (someone else), to save (someone)
 Passive (-am-)
 e.g. : koboma to kill and kobomama to be killed
 Reciprocal or stationary (-an-, sometimes -en-)
 e.g. : kokúta to find and kokútana to meet

Tense inflections
The first tone segment affects the subject part of the verb, the second tone segment attaches to the semantic morpheme attached to the root of the verb.
 present perfect (LH-í)
 simple present (LL-a)
 recurrent present (LL-aka)
 undefined recent past (LH-ákí)
 undefined distant past (LH-áká)
 future (L-ko-L-a)
 subjunctive (HL-a)

Writing system 
Lingala is more a spoken than written language, and has several different writing systems, most of them ad hoc. As literacy in Lingala tends to be low, its popular orthography is very flexible and varies among the two republics. The allophones are also found as alternating forms in the popular orthography; sango is an alternative to nsango (information or news); nyonso, nyoso, nionso, nioso (every) are all transcriptions of nyɔ́nsɔ.

For example, it is almost impossible to type Lingala according to that convention with a common English or French keyboard. The convention of 1976 reduced the alternative orthography of characters but did not enforce tone marking. The lack of consistent accentuation is lessened by the disambiguation due to context.

The popular orthographies seem to be a step ahead of any academic-based orthography. Many Lingala books, papers, even the translation of the Universal Declaration of Human Rights and more recently, Internet forums, newsletters, and major websites, such as Google's Lingala, do not use the Lingala-specific characters ɛ and ɔ. Tone marking is found in most literary works.

Alphabet 

The Lingala alphabet has 35 letters and digraphs. The digraphs each have a specific order in the alphabet; for example, mza will be expected to be ordered before mba, because the digraph mb follows the letter m. The letters r and h are rare but present in borrowed words.
The accents indicate the tones as follows:
 no accent for default tone, the low tone
 acute accent for the high tone
 circumflex for descending tone
 caron for ascending tone

Sample 

The Lord's Prayer (Catholic version)
Tatá wa bísó, ozala o likoló,
bato bakúmisa Nkómbó ya ,
bandima bokonzi bwa , mpo elingo ,
basálá yangó o nsé,
lokóla bakosalaka o likoló
Pésa bísó  biléi bya ,
límbisa mabé ma bísó,
lokóla bísó tokolimbisaka baníngá.
Sálisa bísó tondima masɛ́nginyá tê,
mpe bíkisa bísó o mabé.

Na  bokonzi,
nguyá na nkembo,
o bileko o binso sékô.
Amen.

The Lord's Prayer (Protestant version used in Ubangi-Mongala region)
Tatá na bísó na likoló,
nkómbó na  ezala mosanto,
bokonzi na  eya,
mokano na  esalama na nsé
lokola na likoló.
Pésa bísó kwanga ekokí .
Límbisa bísó nyongo na bísó,
pelamoko elimbisi bísó bango nyongo na bango.
Kamba bísó kati na komekama tê,
kasi bíkisa bísó na mabé.

Mpo ete na  ezalí bokonzi,
na nguyá, na nkembo,
lobiko na lobiko.
Amen. Sample text from Universal Declaration of Human Rights
Bato banso babotamaka na bonsomi mpe bakokani na lokumu mpe na makoki. Bapesameli makanisi mpe lisosoli mpe basengeli kosala epai na mosusu na elimo ya bondeko.  (Article 1 of Universal Declaration of Human Rights)

Mandombe
The Mandombe script is an abugida, primarily used to write Kikongo, that can also be used for Lingala. The script is used in the church of Kimbangu as a liturgical script.

References

Sources 
 Van Everbroeck, René C.I.C.M. (1985) Lingala – Malóba ma lokóta/Dictionnaire. Editions l'Epiphanie. B.P. 724 LIMETE (Kinshasa).
 Edama, Atibakwa Baboya (1994) Dictionnaire bangála–français–lingála. Agence de Coopération Culturelle et Technique SÉPIA.
 Etsio, Edouard (2003) Parlons lingala / Tobola lingala. Paris: L'Harmattan. 
 Bokamba, Eyamba George et Bokamba, Molingo Virginie. Tósolola Na Lingála: Let's Speak Lingala (Let's Speak Series). National African Language Resource Center (May 30, 2005) 
 Guthrie, Malcolm & Carrington, John F. (1988) Lingala: grammar and dictionary: English-Lingala, Lingala-English. London: Baptist Missionary Society.
 Meeuwis, Michael (2020) 'A grammatical overview of Lingala: Revised and extended edition'. (Studies in African Linguistics vol. 81). München: LINCOM Europa. 
 Samarin, William J. (1990) 'The origins of Kituba and Lingala', Journal of African Languages and Linguistics, 12, 47-77.
 Bwantsa-Kafungu, J'apprends le lingala tout seul en trois mois'. Centre de recherche pédagogique, Centre Linguistique Théorique et Appliquée, Kinshasa 1982.
 Khabirov, Valeri. (1998) "Maloba ma nkota Russ-Lingala-Falanse. Русско-лингала-французский словарь". Moscow: Institute of Linguistics-Russian Academy of Sciences (соавторы Мухина Л.М., Топорова И.Н.), 384 p.

External links

Learn Lingala online (Mofeko), Omotola Akindipe, Ulama Masela & Laura Kiala 
First words in Lingala 
Maloba ya lingála 
Dictionnaire bilingues lingala - français 
Dictionary of Congo-Brazzaville National Languages
Lingala-English dictionary Freelang
Lingala Swadesh list of basic vocabulary words (from Wiktionary's Swadesh-list appendix)
PanAfriL10n page on Lingala
UCLA Language Profiles : Lingala
Google in Lingala
Inflections: Problems
Small Collection of Lingala Online resources
Parallel French-Lingala-English texts
Maneno (African blogging platform) in Lingala

Bangi-Ntomba languages
Languages of the Democratic Republic of the Congo
Languages of the Republic of the Congo
Lingala
Vowel-harmony languages